Charles Eugène Delporte (21 March 1914 – 18 June 1940) was a French wrestler. He competed in the men's freestyle lightweight at the 1936 Summer Olympics. He was killed during the Second World War.

Personal life
Delporte served as a matelot fusilier (seaman rifleman) in the French Navy during the Second World War. Stationed at coastal artillery positions in Cherbourg, he was killed by shrapnel on 18 June 1940 during the Battle of France.

References

External links
 

1914 births
1940 deaths
French male sport wrestlers
Olympic wrestlers of France
Wrestlers at the 1936 Summer Olympics
French Navy personnel of World War II
French military personnel killed in World War II
Sportspeople from Lille